The Faroe Islands Premier League (also known as Betri deildin menn for sponsorship reasons) is the top level of football in the Faroe Islands. It was founded in 1942 as Meistaradeildin, and it is played in current format since 2005, when Premier League replaced 1. deild as the country's top football division. The league is organised by the Faroe Islands Football Association.

It is contested by 10 clubs. At the end of every season, two teams are relegated and two promoted from 1. deild.

All teams in the league have semi-professional status.

As of April 2022, the Faroe Islands Premier League is ranked 44th out of 55 leagues in the UEFA coefficient.

History
The league was founded in 1942, although clubs did not take part in European competitions until 1992, because the Faroe Islands Football Association joined UEFA only in 1990. From 1942 to 1946, the competition was played in a knockout format, and from 1947 onwards in a league format.

Before the creation of the Faroe Islands Football Association in 1979, the league was organized by the Faroe Islands Sports Association. The only time a season wasn't played was during the British occupation in 1944, when a lack of footballs caused the season to be cancelled.

The league was known by several names; from its foundation in 1942 until 1975, it was known as Meistaradeildin. It changed its name to 1. deild in 1976 and introduced promotion and relegation system. Since 2005 the league has had different sponsored names, being called Formuladeildin from 2005 to 2008, Vodafonedeildin from 2009 to 2012, Effodeildin from 2012 to 2017, and since 2018 Betri deildin menn.

Competition format
The league is contested by 10 teams, who play each other three times. A draw is made before the elaboration of the next season's fixtures to decide which teams will have an additional home game. Formerly this was decided based on clubs' performance in the previous season.

Promotion and relegation
At the end of the season, two teams are relegated and two are promoted to and from 1. deild. Like in Spain, the teams are allowed to put their B and C teams in the lower divisions, and there will only be relegation if at least one non-reserve team finish in the 1. deild top three.

In the past, the league used a promotion-relegation playoff between the 9th placed team and the 2nd placed team in 1. deild, played from 1995 until 2005.

European qualification
Currently, the Faroese champion qualify to the UEFA Champions League Preliminary round, while the second placed team enter the UEFA Europa Conference League at the first qualifying round. An additional berth in the Europa Conference League first qualifying round is granted to the Faroe Islands Cup winners. If the winners of that competition have already qualified to a European competition, the berth is given to the third placed team in the league. Since the introduction of Europa Conference League, teams from the Faroe Islands can only qualify directly to the UEFA Europa League by winning the Europa Conference League.

Current teams

List of seasons
Bold indicates teams who also won the Faroe Islands Cup that season, an achievement known as the double.

Performance by club

Clubs in bold are currently playing in the top-tier.
Clubs in italics are no longer active in adult football.

Notes

References

External links
League at UEFA
League at FSF 
League at Faroe Soccer
List of football stadiums on the Faroe Islands – Nordic Stadiums

 
1
Faroe